The Bear Necessities are an award-winning, TTBB acappella group from Brown University.  They were established in 1992 making them the youngest of the three TTBB acappella groups at Brown. The Bears have released 7 albums, and are currently in the process of recording their 8th.  They are best known for wearing suspenders and former member Masi Oka, one of the best known alumnus of a college a cappella group and actor in the television series Heroes.  Also known as “The Bears,” the group performs at Brown, across the country and internationally. Their repertoire ranges from R&B to jazz to classic rock to pop to Disney songs.  Founded as an alternative a cappella ensemble, the group has a tradition of highly theatrical, interactive performance and is known for creating a fun, down-to-earth atmosphere in both rehearsal and concert. This is evident in the final track of each of their albums, titled “Bear-a-oke,” a karaoke version of one of the album’s songs designed to invite the listener to sing along. The group’s alumni song is Streets of Philadelphia by Bruce Springsteen, arranged by member Andrew Callard in 1995.

History
Founded in 1992, The Bear Necessities were an outgrowth of The High Jinks, another all-male singing group at Brown. In the early 1990s, The High Jinks dissolved and former members came together as The Bear Necessities (The High Jinks were revived in 2009). Some of the final members of The High Jinks, after moving to New York City after graduation, went on to begin Rockapella, a nationally known a cappella band.

Albums
  Visions (2016)
  Eat the Beach (2012) - "We are left with a standout track in Stronger and a totally solid album capable of scratching your all-male itch..." - RARB Review
 Teaches of Peaches (2009) – White Shadows was awarded a track on the 2009 Voices Only compilation album – “This isn't just a product of studio work. These guys can sing.” – RARB Review
 Dry Clean Only (2003) – “This is a well-recorded disc, and the Bear Necessities' ensemble sound is smooth, blendy, and in tune...Crash Into Me sounds like the old-school a cappella I fell in love with back in 2000 or so; a gorgeous, creative chordal intro leads seamlessly into a faithful rendition of Dave Matthews' beautiful ballad.” – RARB Review
 Circus People (1999) – “The Bear Necessities deliver the goods. The arrangement is gripping, the solo is heartfelt, and the production is spotless. In short, it's a damn good treatment of a damn good song...The group as a whole rises to the occasion and turns in a very tight performance” – RARB Review
 TBNJ: The Bear Necessities Jam (1996) – featuring Masi Oka '97 – “Simply a great album overall...the studio recordings have by far the best production and engineering that I have ever heard on a collegiate album.” – RARB Review
 Out of Hibernation (1995) – “This album restores my faith in male collegiate a cappella...What makes this group different is that they have a better attitude. Their collective tongues are planted firmly in their collective cheeks. They are clearly having a fun time performing the material, which has the result that you'll have a fun time listening to it.” – RARB Review

Masi Oka

A member of The Bear Necessities from 1993 to 1997, Masi Oka served as the group’s musical director during his senior year at Brown.  While a member of the group, he arranged nearly 30 songs including "Invisible Touch" by Genesis, "Faithfully" by Journey, "Flashdance...What a Feeling" by Irene Cara, "All I Want" by Toad the Wet Sprocket, "The Promise" by Tracy Chapman and "With or Without You" by U2.  His arrangements were recorded on the group's second and third albums, TBNJ: The Bear Necessities Jam (which he also produced) and Circus People, respectively.  He has described the group as a “brothership” and says his time in the group was a formative experience for him in college.  A computer science and mathematics student at Brown, he spent the majority of his extracurricular time with the group. Referring to a comedic skit planned in conjunction with a rendition of the song Flashdance, he has been quoted as saying, “We had to go all-out. A cappella is all about commitment.”

Awards and recognition
 In 2009, The Bear Necessities’ cover of the Disney song I'll Make a Man Out of You was awarded a track on Ripple Effect: Constructive Interference, an a cappella compilation album to raise money for Integrated Community Development (ICDI), an organization that sponsors well-drilling efforts in Central Africa
 In 2009, the group’s cover of the Coldplay song White Shadows was awarded a track on the Voices Only: The Best of College A Cappella compilation album
In early 2014, the Bears were named champions of the Casino Theatre a cappella Invitational in Newport, RIun - unseating the Heightsmen of Boston College.

Notable alumni
 Masi Oka, television and film actor, digital effects artist

References

Brown University organizations
Musical groups from Rhode Island
Collegiate a cappella groups
Musical groups established in 1992
1992 establishments in Rhode Island